The  is an electric multiple unit (EMU) train type operated in Japan by the private railway operator Hankyu Railway since 1982.

Formations
, the fleet consists of 83 cars formed as eight-car, six-car, and two-car sets as follows, with one car spare.

8-car sets

 The "Mc" and "M" cars are each fitted with two scissors-type pantographs.

2+6-car sets

 The "Mc" and "M" cars are each fitted with two scissors-type pantographs.

2-car sets

 The "Mc" cars are each fitted with two scissors-type pantographs.

Interior
Passenger accommodation consists of longitudinal bench seating throughout.

History
The 7300 series trains were introduced from 1982.

References

Electric multiple units of Japan
7300 series
Train-related introductions in 1982

1500 V DC multiple units of Japan
Alna Koki rolling stock